Vrbovačko Brdo is an uninhabited settlement in Croatia. The village had a population as high as 271 in 1953 but has been abandoned since 1991.

References

Ghost towns in Croatia